The Matrimandir (Sanskrit for Temple of The Mother) is an edifice of spiritual significance for practitioners of Integral yoga, in the centre of Auroville established by The Mother of the Sri Aurobindo Ashram. It is called soul of the city and is situated in a large open space called Peace.

Structure and surroundings

The Matrimandir took 37 years to build, from the laying of the foundation stone at sunrise on 21 February 1971 - the Mother's 93rd birthday - to its completion in May 2008. It is in the form of a huge sphere surrounded by twelve petals. The Geodesic dome is covered by golden discs and reflects sunlight, which gives the structure its characteristic radiance. Inside the central dome is a meditation hall known as the inner chamber - this contains the largest optically-perfect glass globe in the world. The Matrimandir, and its surrounding gardens in the central Peace Area, is open to the public by appointment.

The four main pillars that support the structure of Matrimandir, and carry the Inner Chamber, have been set at the four main directions of the compass. These four pillars are symbolic of the four aspects of the mother as described by Sri Aurobindo, and are named after these four aspects.

References

External links

Visiting the Matrimandir
Chronicles of the Inner Chamber - by the 'Matrimandir Action Committee'
 

Sri Aurobindo
Meditation
Tourism in Tamil Nadu
Visionary environments
1971 establishments in Tamil Nadu
Auroville
Geodesic domes